Cyril Zimmermann (born 16 January 1976) is a Swiss football referee. He became a FIFA referee in 2007. Previously he was a football player.

References

Living people
Swiss football referees
1976 births
Place of birth missing (living people)
21st-century Swiss people